Terra firma ("solid earth" in Latin) may refer to:
 Solid earth, the planet's solid surface and its interior
 Terra firma forest, moist tropical forest that does not get seasonally flooded
 Terrafirma, the mainland territories of the Republic of Venice
 Terra Firma (Farscape episode)
 Terra Firma Capital Partners, a private equity firm

Music
Terra Firma (band), a Swedish trap group

Albums and EPs
Terra Firma (Sounds from the Ground album)
Terra Firma (Tash Sultana album)
Terra Firma (The Flashbulb EP)
Terra Firma (Tommy Emmanuel and Phil Emmanuel album)
Terra Firma (Wolfstone album)
Terra Firma, 1988 album by Test Dept.

Songs
"Terra Firma" (song), by The Young Knives
"Terra Firma", by Crumbächer
"Terra Firma", by Delerium
"Terra Firma", by MyChildren MyBride
"Terra Firma", by Todd Rundgren

Television
 "Terra Firma" (Star Trek: Discovery), a double-episode of the third season of Star Trek: Discovery

See also
Landmass
Terra (disambiguation)
Firma (disambiguation)
Tierra Firme (disambiguation)
Terraferma (film)
Domini di Terraferma
Savio di Terrafirma